Sophie: A Murder in West Cork is a 2021 docuseries about the death of Sophie Toscan du Plantier, released on Netflix on 30 June 2021. It features Ian Bailey, Barry Roche and Eugene Gilligan.

Cast 
 Ian Bailey
 Barry Roche
 Eugene Gilligan
 Bertrand Bouniol
 Marie Madeleine Opalka
 Peter Bielecki
 Len Lipitch
 Elizabeth Wassell
 Dermot Dwyer
 Pierre-Louis Baudey-Vignaud
 Frédéric Gazeau
 Florence Newman
 Daniel Caron
 Lara Marlowe
 Diane Martin
 Denis Quinlan
 Agnès Thomas
 Michael Sheridan

Episodes

References

External links
 
 

2021 Irish television series debuts
2021 Irish television series endings
2020s Irish television series
Irish documentary television series
Documentary television series about crime
English-language Netflix original programming
Netflix original documentary television series